The He Long Sports Centre Stadium is a multi-purpose stadium in Changsha, Hunan province, China. It is named after Marshal He Long, who was born in the same province and a dedicated supporter of the Chinese "Three Major Ball Games" （三大球）.

The stadium is currently used mostly for football matches. It holds 55,000 people, and was constructed in 1987. The stadium is an all-seater, with a roof covering all spectators.

FIFA International A Matches

Notable Events
Jacky Cheung - A Classic Tour - 25 December 2017

Joker Xue - Skyscraper World Tour - 21 September 2018

References

External links

worldstadiums.com 

Buildings and structures in Changsha
Football venues in China
Sport in Changsha
Multi-purpose stadiums in China
Sports venues in Hunan